New Leaders Council (NLC) is a 501(c)(3) non-profit organization in the United States that works to recruit, train and promote young progressive leaders ranging from elected officials and civically-engaged leaders in business and industry.

NLC's main objective is in "recruiting emerging leaders from outside of the traditional power structures, engaging them on both local and national levels, and equipping them to be civic leaders – not only for elective office, but also in their communities and workplaces."

Chris Kelly, formerly Chief Privacy Officer at Facebook, is currently chairman of the board for the organization.

History 

The New Leaders Council was founded in 2005 and runs on a budget of $900,000.

NLC Institute Program 
At once-monthly NLC Institute seminars, experts provide advanced training in entrepreneurship, communications and marketing, fundraising and campaign management, public speaking and speech writing, and political technology and public relations, to selected fellows, a program of leadership development training with mentoring, networking, and job placement opportunities.

The goal of NLC is to produce a growing corps of diverse and highly skilled new progressive leaders who rise to the top of their fields, working together across sectors and in their local cities to build, expand, and improve the progressive infrastructure necessary for strong democracy, social justice, and equal opportunity.

Affiliated organizations 

New Leaders Council is affiliated with the Center for American Progress, The New Deal, Truman National Security Project, Roosevelt Institute, Mobilize.org, Netroots Nation, Teach for America, Our Time, Louisiana Progress, Young People For, Public Allies Chicago, She Should Run.

Notable alumni 
 Nida Allam
 Lauren Underwood
 Alessandra Biaggi
 Carlos Ramirez-Rosa

References

External links
 

Progressive organizations in the United States
501(c)(3) organizations
2005 establishments in the United States
Organizations established in 2005